This is a list of the members of the National Assembly of Botswana between 2009 and 2014. There were 57 constituency MPs and 4 specially elected MPs. They were elected in the 2009 general elections. Following the elections, several MPs broke away from the ruling Botswana Democratic Party to form an opposition party, the Botswana Movement for Democracy.

List of MPs

References

Botswana,2009
 2009
National Assembly 2009